Virginia Township may refer to the following townships in the United States:

 Virginia Township, Cass County, Illinois
 Virginia Township, Pemiscot County, Missouri
 Virginia Township, Coshocton County, Ohio